Sonny Cunha, full name Albert Richard Cunha (October 1, 1879 – January 23, 1933) was an American composer, bandleader, pianist, singer, politician and entrepreneur. He was the first to popularize hapa haole music, a type of Hawaiian music with influences from popular music and with lyrics that are a combination of English and Hawaiian (or wholly English).

Early years
Albert Richard Cunha was born on October 1, 1879, in Honolulu, Kingdom of Hawai'i to Angela Gilliland and Emmanuel Cunha. He was educated at Saint Louis School and Punahou School and later attended Yale Law School in 1898, where he was a star baseball and football star, although he did not graduate.

In 1903 he composed My Waikiki Mermaid, the earliest known hapa haole song. This was followed in 1905 by his first big hit, My Honolulu Tomboy. Other notable songs followed, My Hawaiian Maid, My Tropical Hula Girl and Honolulu Hula Girl.

In 1905 sextette led by Cunha played the entire summer season at a California beach resort in Santa Cruz.  In 1906 he directed the Royal Hawaiian Glee Club on their tour of the West Coast of the US with the Royal Hawaiian Band.

In 1914 he published the first hapa haole songbook, Famous Hawaiian Songs. He played piano, sang and led a dance orchestra in Honolulu for many years, toured the mainland, founded the Cunha Music Company (which sold instruments and presumably sheet music). He also served as a member of the House of Representatives in the Hawaii Territorial Legislature from 1923 to 1924.

His son was B movie director Richard E. Cunha.

He died on January 23, 1933, in Honolulu. He was buried at the Oahu Cemetery.

Publications
 Songs of Hawaii, Bergstrom Music, 1903
 Famous Hawaiian Songs, Bergstrom Music, 1914

References

Sources

External links
 Tiki Kings Big Ukulele List that includes ukuleles "Made expressly for Cunha Music Co. Honolulu"
 The Hawaiian Music Hall of Fame and Museum

1879 births
1933 deaths
Musicians from Hawaii
American male composers
American composers
Hawaiian ukulele players
Members of the Hawaii Territorial Legislature
American people of Portuguese descent
Punahou School alumni
Yale Law School alumni
Burials at Oahu Cemetery